Ali Öztürk (born April 1, 1993) is a Turkish para table tennis player of class 4 and Paralympian.

In 2014, he won the silver medal along with his brother Abdullah Öztürk and Nesim Turan in the Team C5 event at the World Para Table Tennis Championships in Beijing, China.

He took the gold medal with his teammates Abdullah Öztürk and Nesim Turan in the Team C4 event at the 2016 Lignano Master Open in Italy.

He won the bronze medal in the Team C4–5 event at the 2016 Paralympics in Rio de Janeiro, Brazil  along with Abdullah Öztürk and teammate Nesim Turan.

References

Living people
1993 births
Sportspeople from Ankara
Turkish male table tennis players
Paralympic table tennis players of Turkey
Table tennis players at the 2016 Summer Paralympics
Medalists at the 2016 Summer Paralympics
Paralympic medalists in table tennis
Paralympic bronze medalists for Turkey
Table tennis players at the 2020 Summer Paralympics
Medalists at the 2020 Summer Paralympics
21st-century Turkish people